Deirdre is a feminine given name. Deirdre is the name of a tragic heroine of Irish mythology. It is also the name of:

People
 Deirdre Bair (1935–2020), American literary scholar and biographer
 Deirdre Blomfield-Brown (born 1936), American Tibetan Buddhist nun
 Deirdre Connelly (born 1961), Puerto Rican business executive, particularly with pharmaceutical company GlaxoSmithKline
 Deirdre English (born 1948), American former editor of Mother Jones and author
 Deirdre Hargey, Irish Sinn Féin politician, Minister for Communities within the Northern Ireland Executive, and former Lord Mayor of Belfast
 Deirdre Hutton (born 1949), British public servant
 Deirdre Lovejoy (born 1962), American actress
 Deirdre Madden (born 1960), Irish novelist
 Deirdre McCloskey (born 1942), American economist and philosopher
 Deirdre Mullins, 21st-century Irish actress, director and activist
 Deirdre Sullivan, 21st-century Irish children's writer and poet
 Deirdre Wilson (born 1941), British linguist and cognitive scientist

Fictional characters
 Deirdre Barlow, in the British soap opera Coronation Street
 Deirdre Beaubeirdre, in Everything Everywhere All at Once (2022)
 Deirdre Hortense (Dodie) Bishop, in the American animated TV series As Told by Ginger (2000–2004)
 Deirdre (Halloween), from the 1979 novelization Halloween by Curtis Richards

Feminine given names